Albert Nash may refer to:

 Albert C. Nash (1826–1890), American architect
 Albert L. Nash (1921–2015), American politician and businessman